I with macron (Ӣ ӣ; italics: Ӣ ū) is a letter of the Cyrillic script. In Tajik, it represents a stressed close front unrounded vowel  at the end of a word. In Kildin Sami on the Kola Peninsula and Mansi in western Siberia, it represents long . In those languages, vowel length is distinctive, and the macron marks the long version of vowels.

I with macron is also used in Aleut (Bering dialect). It is the sixteenth letter of the modern Aleut alphabet. It looks similar to the Short I. (Й й Й й)

I with macron also appears in the Bulgarian and Serbian languages.

Computing codes

Usage

South Slavic languages
I with macron is used in some of the South Slavic languages, mainly Bulgarian and Serbian for two-syllable offset based on the old Slavic accent law, to become easy for the accent analogy to pass in separate words, to become lexical. as the analogy passed through three-syllable oxytones with a tonal pattern: тетӣвà.

See also
И и : Cyrillic letter I
Й й : Cyrillic letter Short I
Ī ī : Latin letter I with macron – a Latvian, Latgalian, Livonian, and Samogitian  letter
Cyrillic characters in Unicode

References 

Cyrillic letters with diacritics
Letters with macron